BNT 4 (previously BNT World and BNT Sat), is a Bulgarian-language public international television channel owned and operated by the Bulgarian National Television.

History
The first broadcast of the program was on 2 May 1999, then under the name "TV Bulgaria". The first program director of "TV Bulgaria" is Agnesa Vasileva. The beginning of the program starts with the repetition of the best fund of the BNT, the Bulgarian feature films and music programs. The music channel signal "Tell Me My Le White Cloud" was recorded specifically by Theodosius Spasov. "TV Bulgaria" has had very successful productions - "Ambassadors of Bulgaria" and "One Flew Over the night." On 14 September 2008, the channel name was changed to "BNT SAT." On 20 December 2010 the channel was renamed "BNT World." On 10 September 2018 the channel was further rebranded to "BNT 4"
"BNT 4" broadcasts by satellite free to air.

Television networks in Bulgaria
Bulgarian-language television stations
Television channels and stations established in 1999
1999 establishments in Bulgaria